Crossoliparis is a genus of flowering plants belonging to the family Orchidaceae.

Its native range is Southern Mexico to Northern Venezuela.

Species:
 Crossoliparis wendlandii (Rchb.f.) Marg.

References

Orchids
Orchid genera